Hale Center is a city in Hale County, Texas. The population was 2,252 at the 2010 census.

Geography

Hale Center lies on the high plains of the Llano Estacado at the intersection of Interstate 27 and Farm to Market Road 1914, in central Hale County.

Hale Center is located at  (34.0642436 –101.8437866).

Climate
According to the Köppen climate classification system, Hale Center has a semiarid climate, BSk on climate maps.

History
Hale Center was founded in 1893 with the merger of two rival communities, Hale City and Epworth, both founded in 1891. Residents moved buildings to the new site. The new post office was named for the fact that the community is at the center of the county.

A tornado destroyed downtown Hale Center on June 2, 1965, including many businesses, city hall, and the fire station. Casualties included five dead and 60 injured, with $8 million in property damage.

Demographics

2020 census

As of the 2020 United States census, there were 2,062 people, 791 households, and 529 families residing in the city.

2010 census
At the 2010 census,  2,252 people, 763 households and 568 families resided in the city. The population density was 2,047.3 per square mile (804.3/km). The 867 housing units averaged 788.2 per square mile (309.6/km). The racial makeup of the city was 69.9% White, 4.2% African American, 0.7% Native American, 0.0% Asian, 0.1% from other races, and 2.0% from two or more races. Hispanics or Latinos of any race were 63.2% of the population.

Of the 763 households, 34.5% had children under the age of 18 living with them, 54.5% were married couples living together, 14.3% had a female householder with no husband present, and 25.6% were not families. About 22.5% of all households were made up of individuals, and 12.5% had someone living alone who was 65 years of age or older. The average household size was 2.9 and the average family size was 3.41.

The population was distributed as 31.0% under the age of 18, 53.8% aged 18–64 years old, and 15.2% were 65 years of age and older. The median age was 33.9 years. The population is 48.5% male, and 51.5% female. The median household income was $30,337. The poverty rate was 25.7%.

Education
Hale Center is served by the Hale Center Independent School District and is home to the Hale Center Owls.

See also
Llano Estacado
List of ghost towns in Texas
Running Water Draw
Yellow House Draw
Blackwater Draw
White River (Texas)

References

External links
City of Hale Center official website

Cities in Hale County, Texas
Cities in Texas
1893 establishments in Texas